Time & Space is the second studio album and major label debut by the American punk rock band Turnstile. It was released on February 23, 2018, through Roadrunner – the band's debut on the label.

Upon its release, the album was met with critical acclaim by contemporary music critics, and debuted at number one on the US Billboard Heatseekers chart and number fifteen on the Top Hard Rock Albums chart, selling 2,800 copies in its first week.

Background 

After the release of their debut album in 2015 the band signed to Roadrunner Records to record and release their second album. Speaking to Noisey, lead vocalist Brendan Yates spoke on the bands decision to sign to a major label "It's been super cool. The coolest part about it, and the thing that makes me feel good about being in a band, is that the process was really natural. They expressed interest in putting out our last LP. I think we met them in 2014 but, at that point, it didn't feel natural." going on to say "Obviously, we've grown up on some Roadrunner records, and we've known what the label is based off records that have been inspiring to us, like Madball, Biohazard, and Life of Agony".

Recording 

The album was recorded in 2017/18 with producer Will Yip at his Studio 4 recording facility in Conshohocken, Pennsylvania. Speaking to SPIN in early 2018 Brendan Yates spoke about the bands vision for the album; "It's just the idea of disconnecting oneself from situations and letting go, separating yourself," going on to say "It's just a lot of reflection, in that sense: stepping back and looking at the position you're in, the relationships you're in…[it's about] getting outside of your mind—and out of your body—to see the clearing."

Release 

The album was released worldwide on February 23, 2018, through Roadrunner Records on CD, 12" vinyl and through online services. In the US the record peaked at number one on the Billboard Heatseekers Albums chart, number four on the US Vinyl Albums chart and fifteen on the Top Hard Rock Albums. In Europe the album charted on the UK Rock and Metal Albums chart at number twelve and number eight nine on the German Albums chart.

Critical reception 

The album was met with critical acclaim upon release, holding an aggregated score of 81 on Metacritic based on 12 reviews. Writing for The New York Times, Jon Caramanica gave out praise: "Time & Space" is its outstanding second album, just over 25 minutes long, and an urgent, clear and bruising statement of purpose", adding "this album also has moments of lightness, mild turns in complementary directions that add breathing room and complexity".
Will Richards, writing for DIY, gave the album 4 stars and proclaimed "Turnstile have made a name as one of the most exciting hardcore bands on the planet. Second offering 'Time & Space' hammers the point home, and is a huge hammer-blow". Concluding the article: "Sneaking under the half-hour mark, 'Time & Space' is a comprehensive thrash that places Turnstile as the most inventive, forward-thinking band in hardcore".

Drowned in Sound judged the album a 7/10, with reviewer Adam Turner-Heffer calling the record "easily the most impressive sounding record of their relatively short careers so far, without taking the energy away from their raw power." he did however have a few criticisms ; "If there is a major criticism to be lobbed at Time & Space however, is that its one-noted nature will make it difficult for anyone outside of genre fans to want to reach out over and encourage a crossover appeal".

Pitchfork offered up a mixed review, summarizing reviewer Sam Lefebvre wrote "The "experimentation" on the Baltimore band's latest album is hesitant and unfocused. It's a punishingly familiar collision of yesteryear's crossover rock with textbook hardcore bluster". The Guardian also gave it a mixed review, with Dave Simpson commenting on the short length of certain album tracks; "Former Lauryn Hill backing singer Tanikka Charraé turns up on Bomb's funky hip-hop interlude, but again it's over in seconds, and one wonders what they could have achieved by being even bolder."

Kerrang! magazine praised the album highly on release, awarding it their full 5-K rating, and later named it the best album of 2018 in their year-end list.

Accolades

Track listing

Charts

Release history

Personnel 
Personnel per booklet.

Turnstile
 Brendan Yates – lead vocals
 Franz Lyons – bass, percussion, backing vocals; lead vocals (on "Moon")
 Brady Ebert – guitars
 Pat McCrory – guitars
 Daniel Fang – drums, percussion, backing vocals

Production
 Will Yip – production, sound engineer, mixing, programming
 Diplo – additional production - track 11
 Vince Ratti – mixing
 Ryan Smith – mastering
 Justin Anstotz – assistant engineer

Additional musicians
 Arthur Rizk – guitars
 Luke O'Reilly – piano
 Justice Tripp – backing vocals
 Tanikka Meyers – backing vocals
 Christina Halliday – backing vocals
 Jeff Caffey – backing vocals

References 

2018 albums
Turnstile (band) albums
Roadrunner Records albums
Albums produced by Will Yip